The AirPort Express is a Wi-Fi base station product from Apple Inc., part of the AirPort product line. While more compact and in some ways simpler than another Apple Wi-Fi base station, the AirPort Extreme, the Express offers audio output capability the Extreme lacks. The AirPort Express was the first AirPlay device to receive streamed audio from a computer running iTunes on the local network. AirPort Express outperforms the stringent requirements of the ENERGY STAR Program Requirements for Small Network Equipment (SNE) Version 1.0.

Apple discontinued developing its wireless routers in 2018, but  continues limited support of later models.

Description
When connected to an Ethernet network, the Express can function as a wireless access point. The latest model allows up to 50 networked users. It can be used as an Ethernet-to-wireless bridge under certain wireless configurations. It can be used to extend the range of a network, including functioning as a printer and audio server. The model introduced in June 2012 includes two Ethernet ports: one WAN and one LAN.

The original version (M9470LL/A, model A1084) was introduced by Apple on July 7, 2004, and included an analog–optical audio mini-jack output, a USB port for remote printing or charging the iPod (iPod shuffle only), and one Ethernet port. The main processor of the 802.11g AirPort Express was a Broadcom BCM4712KFB wireless networking chipset, which incorporated a 200 MHz MIPS processor. The audio was handled by a Texas Instruments Burr-Brown PCM2705 16-bit digital-to-analog converter.

An updated version (MB321LL/A, model A1264) supporting the faster 802.11 Draft-N draft specification and operation in either of the 2.4 GHz and 5 GHz bands, with almost all other features identical, was introduced by Apple in March 2008. The revised unit includes an 802.11a/n (5 GHz) mode, which allows adding Draft-N to an existing 802.11b/g network without disrupting existing connections, while preserving the increased throughput that Draft-N can provide. Up to 10 wireless units can connect to this AirPort Express.

The AirPort Express uses an audio connector that combines a 3.5 mm minijack socket and a mini-TOSLINK optical digital transmitter, allowing connection to an external digital-to-analog converter (DAC) or amplifier with internal DAC. Standard audio CDs ripped in iTunes into Apple Lossless format streamed to the AirPort Express will output a bit-for-bit identical bitstream when compared to the original CD (provided any sound enhancement settings in iTunes are disabled). DTS-encoded CDs ripped to Apple Lossless audio files - which decode as digital white noise in iTunes - will play back correctly when the AirPort Express is connected via TOSLINK to a DTS-compatible amplifier–decoder. This is limited to 16-bit and 44.1 kHz when streaming from iTunes; any higher quality content, such as high fidelity audio that uses up to 24-bit and/or 192 kHz will be truncated down to 16-bit and 44.1 kHz.

The audio output feature of the AirPort Express on a system running OS X Lion or earlier can only be used to wirelessly stream audio files from within iTunes to an attached stereo system. It cannot be used to output the soundtrack of iTunes video content to an attached stereo. OS X Mountain Lion introduced AirPlay support, a feature to output Mac system-wide audio directly to AirPort Express. This allows output of the audio of protected video content within iTunes, and also correctly maintains the audio sync with the image displayed on-screen. Video is synced with output audio when playing the video through an AirPort Express if the video is in a format supported by QuickTime Player (such as HTML 5 video in Safari etc.).

For Windows and Mac operating systems (before OS X Mountain Lion) there are a few software options available for streaming system-wide audio to the AirPort Express, such as Airfoil, TuneBlade and Porthole.

On August 28, 2018 Apple added AirPlay 2 support to the 2012 AirPort Express, providing the ability to be added to the Apple Home app as an audio destination.

Discontinuation and support
According to a Bloomberg report on November 21, 2016, "Apple Inc. has disbanded its division that develops wireless routers, another move to try to sharpen the company’s focus on consumer products that generate the bulk of its revenue, according to people familiar with the matter."

In an April 2018 statement to 9to5Mac, Apple announced the discontinuation of its AirPort line, effectively leaving the consumer router market. Apple continued supporting the AirPort Express, although an older version of its "AirPort Utility" is required to support the earliest version of the device.

Models

See also

AirPort Time Capsule

Notes

Apple Inc. peripherals
2004 introductions
Discontinued Apple Inc. products